Triad Strategies is a bipartisan public affairs firm headquartered in Harrisburg, PA, with offices in Philadelphia and Pittsburgh. Triad provides government affairs, advocacy and communications, and economic development services to organizations seeking to influence and create opportunities in the public and private sectors.

Triad Strategies was founded in 2002 with the merger of W.A. Hawkins Associates and Sellers, Feinberg & Associates.

References

Organizations based in Harrisburg, Pennsylvania
Lobbying firms based in Pennsylvania